The Venerable  James Treanor  was  Archdeacon of Tuam  from 1898 until 1928.

Treanor educated at  Trinity College, Dublin and ordained in 1870. After a curacy at Tuam he held Incumbencies at Athenry, Kiltullagh, Galway and Ballinrobe. He was Precentor of St Mary's Cathedral, Tuam from 1890 until his appointment as Archdeacon.

Notes

Irish Anglicans
Archdeacons of Tuam
Alumni of Trinity College Dublin
Living people
Year of birth missing (living people)